Perotrochus metivieri is a species of large sea snail, a marine gastropod mollusk in the family Pleurotomariidae, the slit snails.

Description
The shell grows to a length of 65 mm.

Distribution
This species occurs in the South China Sea.

References

External links
 To Biodiversity Heritage Library (1 publication)
 To Encyclopedia of Life
 To USNM Invertebrate Zoology Mollusca Collection
 To World Register of Marine Species
 

Pleurotomariidae
Gastropods described in 1995